Rushcliffe is a local government district with borough status in Nottinghamshire, England. The population of the Local Authority at the 2011 Census was 111,129. Its council is based in West Bridgford. It was formed on 1 April 1974 by merging the West Bridgford Urban District, the Bingham Rural District and part of Basford Rural District.

The district was named after the old Rushcliffe wapentake. Rushcliffe means "cliff where brushwood grows", from Old English hris "brushwood" and clif "cliff".

Political representation

Forty four councillors were elected at the borough council election in May 2019. There are 29 Conservatives, giving them control of the council. There are also 7 Labour, 3 Independents, 3 Liberal Democrats and 2 Greens. The next borough council election is due in May 2023.

The member of parliament for the parliamentary constituency of Rushcliffe is the Conservative, Ruth Edwards. As of the December 2019 general election, Rushcliffe is one of eight Tory-held constituencies in Nottinghamshire, out of a total of eleven. The next general election is due in May 2024.

Geography
South-east of Nottingham, the Rushcliffe boundary splits from the City of Nottingham boundary near the Holme Pierrepont Watersports Centre and then follows the River Trent to near RAF Syerston, which is the most northern part of the district, although Syerston the village itself is in the Newark and Sherwood district. It meets the River Devon near Cotham, then follows this river to the east southwards to where it meets the Leicestershire boundary. To the south, the Leicestershire/Rushcliffe boundary crosses the runways of the former RAF Langar with most of the airfield in Rushcliffe.

Rushcliffe is split between an urbanised north-west, containing suburbs of Greater Nottingham that have not been incorporated into the city, and the south and east which is predominantly rural, which stretches to the Leicestershire border. Many of these villages lie in the Vale of Belvoir. The Grantham Canal threads from nearby Grantham through Rushcliffe to the River Trent. Villages in the Vale of Belvoir include Redmile, Hickling, Harby, Stathern and Langar. Geographically, the River Soar marks the divide between the two counties.

Demographics
In 2001, there were around 43,600 households in the district, with about 106,000 people. 44% or nearly half of Rushcliffe's population lives in West Bridgford. The average house price is the highest in Nottinghamshire and in the top three in the East Midlands. It is one of the most affluent areas of the East Midlands, and consistently in the top ten of the nicest places to live in the UK.

Education
The district has the best GCSE results within Nottinghamshire and throughout the East Midlands. . Rushcliffe Spencer Academy and West Bridgford school have ranked regularly in the top 100 comprehensive schools in the UK for GCSE results. In 2014 West Bridgford was ranked at 63rd of all comprehensives in the UK with 83% achieving '5+ A*-C GCSEs (or equivalent) including English and maths GCSEs' and Rushcliffe 81st in the UK with 82% achieving 5 A*-C in 2014.

The Becket School (partly geographically outside the Rushcliffe district), West Bridgford School and Rushcliffe Spencer Academy get A level results for 'Average point score per A level student (full-time equivalent)' in the top 10% of all schools in the UK, comprehensive or selective, better than many English grammar schools. These scores are in the top 2% for all UK comprehensives.

Sutton Bonington is in the south of the district, which has the Sutton Bonington Campus of the University of Nottingham.

Wards 
Abbey Ward
Bingham East Ward
Bingham West Ward
Bunny Ward
Compton Acres Ward
Cotgrave Ward
Cranmer Ward
Cropwell Ward
East Bridgford Ward
Edwalton Ward
Gamston North Ward
Gamston South Ward
Gotham Ward
Keyworth and Wolds Ward
Lady Bay Ward
Leake Ward
Lutterell Ward
Musters Ward
Nevile and Langar Ward
Radcliffe on Trent Ward
Ruddington Ward
Sutton Bonington Ward
Thoroton Ward
Tollerton Ward
Trent Bridge Ward

Notable residents 

Conservative politician Kenneth Clarke (the MP for the area from 1970 to 2019 and who served as Chancellor of the Exchequer from 1993 to 1997) lives in West Bridgford
Actress Sherrie Hewson (Coronation Street, Emmerdale, Crossroads and Loose Women) lives in the Edwalton Hall development 
Famous rose grower Harry Wheatcroft lived with his family in West Bridgford
The majority of Nottingham Forest Football Club players live in Rushcliffe  and have included Stuart Pearce, Andy Cole and Ian Wright. Former Manager Frank Clark lived in Keyworth.  A number of ex-Nottingham Forest Players remain in the Rushcliffe area.  
 Former England Test cricketer, off spin bowler and Strictly Come Dancing contestant Graeme Swann

Arms

References

External links 

 Rushcliffe Country Park

 
Non-metropolitan districts of Nottinghamshire
Eco-towns
Boroughs in England